Kente  refers to a Ghanaian textile, made of handwoven cloth, strips of silk and cotton. Historically the fabric was worn in a toga-like fashion by royalty among the Akan. It originated from Bonwire in the Ashanti region of Ghana. In modern day Ghana, the wearing of kente cloth has become widespread to commemorate special occasions, with highly sought-after kente brands led by master weavers.

Due to the popularity of kente cloth patterns, kente print, which is a mass-produced version, is popular throughout the West. Globally, the print is used in the design of academic stoles in graduation ceremonies.

Etymology 

Kente comes from the word kenten, which means "basket" in the Asante dialect of the Akan language, referencing its basket-like pattern. In Ghana, the Akan ethnic group also refers to kente as nwentoma, meaning "woven cloth". Ashanti folklore includes a story where weavers invented kente by seeking to replicate the patterns of Anansi the spider.

History 

West African cultures have been weaving textiles for thousands of years. 
Kente may have developed from a variety of weaving traditions which existed in Ghana since before the 11th century, with excavations in the region showing instruments such as spindles, whorls, and loom weights. By the 18th century, during the rise of the Ashanti Empire, kente became popularized among Akan royalty, and by the early 19th century master weavers and kente houses could be seen throughout the Ashanti capital of Kumasi.

Production
Kente production can be classified by three versions: authentic kente cloth made by traditional weavers, kente print produced by brands such as Vlisco and Akosombo Textile Ltd, and mass-produced kente pattern typically produced in China for Westerners. Authentic kente cloth is the most expensive, while kente print varies in price depending on production style.

For authentic kente, the towns of Bonwire, Sakora Wonoo, Ntonso, Safo and Adawomase are noted for kente weaving, and are located in the Ashanti region.

Weaving is done on a wooden loom in which multiple threads of dyed fabric are pressed together. Weavers are typically apprenticed under a master weaver or company for a number of years before producing their own patterns. Rolls of cloth are then imprinted with a brand to signify authenticity.

Gender has an influence on cloth production. Weaving kente is traditionally considered a male practice.

Characteristics
There exist hundreds of different kinds of kente patterns. Kente patterns vary in complexity, with each pattern having a name or message by the weaver. Ghanaians choose kente cloths as much for their names as their colors and patterns. Although the cloths are identified primarily by the patterns found in the lengthwise (warp) threads, there is often little correlation between appearance and name. Names are derived from several sources, including proverbs, historical events, important chiefs, queen mothers, and plants. The cloth symbolizes high value.

Ahwepan refers to a simple design of warp stripes, created using plain weave and a single pair of heddles. The designs and motifs in kente cloth are traditionally abstract, but some weavers also include words, numbers and symbols in their work. Example messages include adweneasa, which translates as "i've exhausted my skills", is a highly decorated type of kente with weft-based patterns woven into every available block of plain weave. Because of the intricate patterns, adweneasa cloth requires three heddles to weave.

Symbolic meanings of the colors
 

 black: maturation, intensified spiritual energy, spirits of ancestors, passing rites, mourning, and funerals
 blue: peacefulness, harmony, and love
 green: vegetation, planting, harvesting, growth, spiritual renewal
 gold: royalty, wealth, high status, glory, spiritual purity
 grey: healing and cleansing rituals; associated with ash
 maroon: the color of mother earth; associated with healing
 pink: assoc. with the female essence of life; a mild, gentle aspect of red
 purple: assoc. with feminine aspects of life; usually worn by women
 red: political and spiritual moods; bloodshed; sacrificial rites and death.
 silver: serenity, purity, joy; associated with the moon
 white: purification, sanctification rites and festive occasions
 yellow: preciousness, royalty, wealth, fertility, beauty

Controversy

In June 2020, Democratic Party leaders in the United States caused controversy by wearing stoles made of kente cloth to show support against systemic racism. While it was said to be an act of unity with African-Americans, many, including Jade Bentil, a Ghanaian-Nigerian researcher, voiced objection tweeting "My ancestors did not invent Kente cloth for them to be worn by publicity (obsessed) politicians as 'activism' in 2020". On the other hand Congressional Black Caucus chair Karen Bass said, at a news conference for the introduction of the Justice in Policing Act of 2020, that the non-black lawmakers were showing solidarity, and April Reign, who is credited with initiating the #OscarsSoWhite hashtag, while not a fan of the symbolism, suggested that the legislation's fate is more relevant than the event in the Capitol's Emancipation Hall.

There is also a controversy with Louis Vuitton's usage of a printed and monogrammed version of kente in their autumn-winter 2021 collection by American creative director Virgil Abloh, whose grandmother was Ghanaian. Additionally, questions of ownership of the woven craft, its image, and location of ateliers of production of kente. To this question of cultural appropriation, Abloh's response to the press in 2020 was: "Provenance is reality; ownership is a myth. In the same way, we cannot control our inspirations, we cannot trade-mark natural or cultural heritage as contemporary artistic territory." This coincided with the first appearance of this design of kente cloth printed on a dress worn by American poet Amanda Gorman for the cover of Vogue's May 2021 issue.

References

External links

 African fabric and fashion
 Kente Cloth Style Collections
 National Folklore Board (Ghana)

Ghanaian culture
Ashanti Region
Akan culture
Ashanti people
Woven fabrics
African clothing
Articles containing video clips